Niger–United States relations are bilateral relations between Niger and the United States.  Niger and the United States have a strong and longstanding partnership based on shared democratic values and a commitment to promoting peace, security, and development in West Africa. The two countries cooperate on a range of issues, including counter-terrorism, trade and investment, and health and education.

The United States is one of Niger's top development partners, providing assistance through various programs to support economic growth, food security, and health care. The United States also works closely with Niger's military and security forces to improve their capacity to counter violent extremist organizations and to protect the country's borders.

In addition to cooperation on security and development issues, the United States and Niger also have a strong trade and investment relationship. The United States is Niger's largest trading partner, and there are many American companies operating in Niger, particularly in the mining and energy sectors.

According to the 2018 U.S. Global Leadership Report, 53% of Nigeriens approve of U.S. leadership, with 21% disapproving and 26% uncertain.

History 
U.S. relations with Niger have generally been close and friendly since Niger attained independence. Although USAID does not have a Mission in Niger, $30 million in annual official aid is administered through American and local non-governmental organizations with programs addressing food security, health, local governance, youth training, girls' education, corruption control, and improving the business environment. The U.S. Peace Corps program in Niger started in 1962. It currently has about 130 volunteers in Niger and celebrated its 50th anniversary in Niger in September 2012.

In January 2013, the U.S. and Niger signed an agreement allowing the U.S. to operate unarmed drones from Nigerien territory. 
In February 2013, the U.S. deployed 100 troops to assist in intelligence collection and will also facilitate intelligence sharing to support French operations in neighboring Mali.

Military relations
The United States operates several military bases in Niger, including in Arlit and Agadez.

The Central Intelligence Agency operates a drone base near Dirkou.

Niger is an important partner for the United States in the fight against terrorism in West Africa and is a member of the Global Coalition to Defeat ISIS. The United States has provided training and equipment to Niger's military and security forces to help them counter terrorism and transnational crime.

Residente diplomatic missions
 Niger has an embassy in Washington, D.C.
 United States has an embassy in Niamey.

See also
Foreign relations of Niger
Foreign relations of the United States
List of ambassadors of Niger to the United States
United States Ambassador to Niger

References

External links
History of Niger - U.S. relations

 
Bilateral relations of the United States
United States